The Ministry of Youth and Sports (Yuba ō krīṛā mantraṇālaẏa) is the government ministry of Bangladesh.

Directorates
Directorate of Sports
National Sports Council
Bangladesh Krira Shikkha Protishtan (BKSP) (Bangladesh Sports Education)
Youth Development Department
Sheikh Hasina National Youth Center

References

 
Youth and Sports
Bangladesh
Bangladesh
Ministries established in 1991
1991 establishments in Bangladesh